Alkalay is a surname. Notable people with the surname include:

Albert Alcalay (1907–1976), American artist
Ammiel Alcalay (born 1945), American poet
Luna Alcalay (1928–2012), Croatian-Austrian musician
Milos Alcalay (born 1956), Venezuelan diplomat
Reuben Alcalay (1917–2008), Israeli author